Mikkel Rønnow (born 1974 in Odense) is a Theatrical Producer and Musical Director.

Since 1992 Mikkel Rønnow has produced musicals, concerts and plays in Denmark. He is the sole owner of Mikkel Rønnow Musicals, a producing and general managing company.

Mikkel Rønnow is the originating producer of the international Lennon & McCartney show She Loves You.

Other shows include 5 productions of Chess (Danish premiere), Sweeney Todd, Atlantis, West Side Story, Les Misérables, La Cage Aux Folles, My Fair Lady, Copacabana (Scandinavian premiere), Grease, Cabaret, Dirty Dancing and Saturday Night Fever.

Mikkel Rønnow's musical direction can be heard on numerous cast albums, including the internationally acclaimed complete recording of Chess from 2002 as well as Copacabana, Grease and the Lloyd Webber album "Look With Your Heart", starring Louise Fribo and Odense Symphony Orchestra.

He is a member of Danish Conductors Association.

1974 births
Living people
Danish musicians
20th-century Danish musicians
21st-century Danish musicians